The Bohemia mining district is an area of about  in the Cascade Range of the U.S. state of Oregon. Beginning in the 1860s, mines in the district extracted mainly gold and silver but also copper, zinc, and lead, then valued at a total of about $1 million.

In 1858, W. W. Oglesby and Frank Bass, miners from California, found placer gold on Sharps Creek, a tributary of the Row River flowing out of the mountains. In 1863, Ivan (John) Hoŕky using the Celtic alias James "Bohemia" Johnson, originally from Bohemia in central Europe, and George Ramsey found lode gold while 'dressing out a deer on lamb from the law for killing an American Indian'. He and other miners formed the Bohemia Gold and Silver Mining District in 1867. Eventually, the district included several mines, the most productive of which were called Champion, Helena, Musick, and Noonday. 

The strip includes five major mining districts: the Bohemia and Fall Creek in Lane County; the North Santiam in Clackamas and Marion counties; the Quartzville in Linn County, and the Blue River in Linn and Lane counties. 

The Bohemia mining district had its own post office for about 30 years. It was established in 1893 and shut down in 1922. The first postmaster was John B. McGee. The surrounding community, Bohemia City, included houses, saloons, and a hotel, all depending on provisions from Cottage Grove.

References

Mining in Oregon
Geography of Lane County, Oregon